Megan Sylvester (born 4 July 1994 in Barnsley) is a synchronised diver. Her team is city of Sheffield and her coach is Adam Sotheran. Megan Sylvester began diving in 2002 at the age of eight following her older brother.

International record
In her international competitions she has won one bronze and one silver with three 4th, one 8th, one 6th and one 10th. On the other hand, in her domestic events she got four golds, one silver, one 10th and lastly one 4th.

As a junior, she won all three platform events at the British junior nationals, and then won silver at the junior European championships platform final in 2008 following with a 4th-place finish at the junior world championships later that year. In 2009, she teamed up with Monique Gladding and won 6th place at the senior world championships in the synchro event the same year.

Megan Sylvester's dream had always been to win a gold medal on home soil at the 2012 London Olympics. Her greatest achievement she thinks is winning silver at the European juniors in 2008 and finishing 4th at the 2008 world juniors.

References

British female divers
Sportspeople from Barnsley
1994 births
Living people
Divers at the 2010 Summer Youth Olympics